Robert A. Connors is a member of the Northeastern University athletics Hall of Fame. Connors was inducted in 1990 for excellence in football. Connors has also been elected to the Wakefield High School Hall of Fame.

Connors came to Northeastern from Waltham High School was a quarterback. Connors quickly found success on the field and during the 1967 and 1968 seasons he guided the Huskies to a combined record of 13–4. When Connors graduated he left with career football records for passes thrown and completed, touchdown passes and yard gained in a season. Connors was also the team's punter.

Due to his success at Northeastern along with his pure athletic ability the New York Giants tried him out as a defensive back. Connors went on to play with the Long Island Bulls of the Atlantic Coast Football League in 1970.

For the following years Connors moved back to his high school alma mater and began coaching at Waltham High. He was promoted to head coach in 1976, a position he held until 1981, compiling a 43-14 record.

In 1984 Connors was asked to be the head coach at Wakefield High School to turn around their struggling program. Connors held the position until 1989 before he moved to Bentley College to become the Falcons offensive coordinator. Connors remained with Bentley until 1997.

References

External links
 GoNU.com Hall of Fame Profile

Year of birth missing (living people)
Living people
American football quarterbacks
Atlantic Coast Football League players
Bentley Falcons football coaches
Northeastern Huskies football players
High school football coaches in Massachusetts